Hemipsilichthys is a genus of catfishes belonging to the family Loricariidae. These wide-mouthed freshwater catfishes are restricted to southeast Brazil in the Paraíba do Sul, Perequê-Áçu and Taquari river basins. Hemipsilichthys, along with Delturus, form a clade (Delturinae). In these two genera, members have a ridge behind their dorsal fin and an adipose fin membrane. However, in Hemipsilichthys, the dorsal fin membrane and most anterior plate of the adipose fin do not touch, while they do in Delturus.

Species
There are currently three recognized species in this genus: Additional species were formerly placed in this genus, but these are now placed in Pareiorhaphis.

 Hemipsilichthys gobio (Lütken, 1874)
 Hemipsilichthys nimius Pereira, Reis, Souza & Lazzarotto, 2003
 Hemipsilichthys papillatus Pereira, Oliveira & Oyakawa, 2000

References

Loricariidae
Fish of South America
Catfish genera
Taxa named by Rosa Smith Eigenmann
Taxa named by Carl H. Eigenmann
Freshwater fish genera